The Georgia Bulldogs football program represents the University of Georgia in the sport of American football. The Bulldogs compete in the Football Bowl Subdivision (FBS) of the National Collegiate Athletic Association (NCAA) and the Eastern Division of the Southeastern Conference (SEC). They play their home games at historic Sanford Stadium on the university's Athens, Georgia, campus. Georgia claims four consensus national championships (1942, 1980, 2021, and 2022); while the AP and Coaches Polls have each voted the Bulldogs the national champion three times (1980, 2021, and 2022). Georgia has also been named the National Champion by at least one polling authority in four other seasons (1920, 1927, 1946 and 1968).

The Bulldogs' other accomplishments include 16 conference championships, of which 14 are SEC championships, second-most in conference history, and appearances in 61 bowl games, second-most all-time. The program has also produced two Heisman Trophy winners, five number-one National Football League (NFL) draft picks, and many winners of other national awards. In addition to its storied history, the team is known for its unique traditions and rabid fan base, known as the "Bulldog Nation." Georgia has won over 860 games in its history, placing them 9th all-time in wins and has finished in the Top 10 of the AP Poll 27 times, 14 of which were Top 5 finishes.

History

Conference affiliations
Georgia was a founding member of the Southern Intercollegiate Athletic Association, one of the first collegiate athletic conferences formed in the United States. Georgia participated in the SIAA from its establishment in 1895 until 1921. During its tenure in the SIAA, Georgia was conference co-champion in two years, 1896 and 1920. In 1921, the Bulldogs, along with 12 other teams, left the SIAA and formed the Southern Conference. During its time in the Southern Conference, the team never won a conference championship. In 1932, the Georgia Bulldogs left the Southern Conference to form and join the SEC, where Georgia has won the second-most SEC football championships, with 14, behind Alabama (27).
 Independent (1891–1895)
 Southern Intercollegiate Athletic Association (1896–1920)
 Southern Conference (1921–1932)
 Southeastern Conference (1933–present)

Championships

National championships
Georgia has been selected eight times (1920, 1927, 1942, 1946, 1968, 1980, 2021, 2022) as national champions from NCAA-designated major selectors. Georgia claims four national championships (1942, 1980, 2021, and 2022). In 1980 they finished as the only undefeated team after a victory in the 1981 Sugar Bowl, and were named the national champions by all four major consensus selectors  (AP, Coaches, FWAA, and NFF). In 2021 they won the College Football Playoff, defeating Alabama in the CFP National Championship Game, ending a 41 year title drought. In 2022 they won the 2023 CFP National Championship Game after going 15-0 as the only undefeated team.

Claimed national championships

† Other consensus selectors for 1980 included Berryman, Billingsley, Rothman, Football News, Helms, NCF, Poling, Sagarin (ELO-Chess), Sporting News†† Other consensus selectors for 2021 include AP, FWAA/NFF, USAT/AMWAY (Coaches)

Unclaimed national championships

Claimed national championship
 1920 – First-year head Herman Stegeman led the program to its second undefeated season, outscored opponents 250–17.
 1927 – Georgia's famous Dream and Wonder team led by George Woodruff went 9–1. This team was noted for having a win over 1920s power, Yale, in Connecticut. Georgia was ranked No. 1 going into its final game against rival Georgia Tech, where they were upset 12–0 in the rain. Even so, Georgia finished the season ranked No. 1 in two minor polls.
 1942 – Georgia was chosen as champion by at least half of the recognized polls. Georgia was led by All-Americans Frank Sinkwich and end George Poschner, along with a young back named Charley Trippi. The Bulldogs knocked off 9 consecutive opponents and ranked No. 1 in the nation. Georgia earned a Rose Bowl bid after it blanked Georgia Tech 34–0 in Athens to end the regular season. Georgia then edged UCLA 9–0 in the Rose Bowl.
 1946 – Fueled by the return of Charley Trippi, the 1946 SEC Champion Bulldogs went 10–0, including a 20–10 win over North Carolina in the Sugar Bowl. Notre Dame finished the season ranked No. 1 in the majority of the polls, but the Williamson poll recognized Georgia as No. 1.
 1968 – The 1968 Bulldogs won Vince Dooley's second SEC Championship as head coach, and finished the season undefeated. However the 8–0–2 Bulldogs tied twice, and then lost to Arkansas in the Sugar Bowl. The Litkenhous poll recognized them as National Champions.
 1980 – The Bulldogs beat Notre Dame 17–10 in the Sugar Bowl to finish 12–0 and claim the National Championship. Notable contributors during the season included Herschel Walker, Buck Belue, and Lindsay Scott (Georgia was listed first by AP, Berryman, FACT, FB News, FW, Helms, National Championship Foundation, NFF, Poling, Sporting News, and UPI).
 2021 – The Bulldogs beat Alabama 33–18 in the National Championship Game to finish at 14–1 and claim the National Championship.
 2022 – The Bulldogs beat TCU 65-7 in the National Championship Game to finish 15-0 for the first time in school history and claim the National Championship.

Conference championships
Georgia has won a total of 16 conference championships, eleven outright and five shared. The school's 14 Southeastern Conference Championships rank it second all time in SEC history, behind only Alabama.

† Co-champions

Division championships
Georgia has won eleven SEC Eastern Division championships, and has made nine appearances in the SEC Championship Game, most recently in 2022. The Dawgs are 4–6 in those games. Twice, in 1992 and 2007, Georgia was the Eastern Division co-champion, but lost a tiebreaker for the right to appear in the championship game.

† Co-champions

Bowl games
The Bulldogs have played in 61 bowl games, second all-time. UGA has a bowl record of 36–21–3. Their 36 wins rank the Dawgs second all-time in bowl wins. They have played in a record 18 different bowls including appearances in five of the New Year's Six Bowl Games (2 Rose, 4 Orange, 3 Cotton, 7 Peach, and 11 Sugar Bowls) and appearances in the 2018, 2022, and 2023 College Football Playoff National Championship.

Head coaches

Head coaches of the Bulldogs dating from 1892.

Coaching awards
 Amos Alonzo Stagg Award
Vince Dooley – 2001
 Paul "Bear" Bryant Award
Vince Dooley – 1980
 Broyles Award
Brian VanGorder – 2003
 College Football Hall of Fame
 Glenn "Pop" Warner, inducted in 1951
 Joel Hunt, inducted in 1967
 Wally Butts, inducted in 1997
 Vince Dooley, inducted in 1995

Personnel

Coaching staff

Nicknames
The first mention of "Bulldogs" in association with Georgia athletics occurred on November 28, 1901, at the Georgia-Auburn football game played in Atlanta. The Georgia fans had a badge saying "Eat `em Georgia" and a picture of a bulldog tearing a piece of cloth; however, it was not until 1920 that the nickname "Bulldog" was used to describe the athletic teams at the University of Georgia. Traditionally, the choice of a Bulldog as the UGA mascot was attributed to the alma mater of its founder and first president, Abraham Baldwin, who graduated from Yale University. Prior to that time, Georgia teams were usually known as the "Red and Black." On November 3, 1920, Morgan Blake of the Atlanta Journal wrote a story about school nicknames and proposed:
The Georgia Bulldogs would sound good because there is a certain dignity about a bulldog, as well as ferocity.
After a 0–0 tie with Virginia in Charlottesville on Nov. 6, 1920, Atlanta Constitution writer Cliff Wheatley used the name "Bulldogs" in his story five times. The name has been used ever since.

Traditions

 "Between the Hedges" Legendary sports writer Grantland Rice coined the term that famously describes the home of the Bulldogs in the 1930s in reference to the famous English privet hedges that have surrounded the Sanford Stadium turf since its inaugural game against Yale in 1929. The original hedges were removed in 1996 in preparation for the women's soccer matches hosted at Sanford Stadium for the 1996 Centennial Olympic Games. Offshoots of the original hedges were planted shortly after the games. The Hedges also serve as a crowd control measure, as they contain a fence inside of them. In fact, only once have Georgia fans been able to rush the field, that following a victory over Tennessee in 2000.
 Uga (pronounced UH-guh) is the name of a lineage of white Bulldogs which have served as the mascot of the University of Georgia since 1956. The current mascot, "Que", officially took the role of Uga X on October 23, 2015, shortly before Uga IX, or "Russ", died after four years serving as the mascot. Deceased Ugas are interred in a mausoleum near the main entrance to Sanford Stadium. Georgia is the only school to bury its past mascots inside the football stadium.
 Glory, Glory is the rally song for the Georgia Bulldogs and was sung at football games as early as the 1890s. The rally song was arranged in its current form by Georgia professor Hugh Hodgson in 1915. While "Glory, Glory" is the most commonly played Georgia song, the school's official fight song is "Hail To Georgia" which is played after field goals.
 The ringing of the Chapel Bell after a Georgia victory started in the 1890s when the playing field was located near the chapel and freshmen were compelled to ring the chapel's bell until midnight to celebrate the victory. Today, freshmen are no longer required to do the chore, with students, alumni, and fans taking their place.
 "The Battle Hymn of the Bulldog Nation" is a slowed down version of The Battle Hymn of the Republic arranged in 1987 and is a hallowed song played pregame and postgame by the Redcoat Band. A lone trumpeter in the southwest corner of Sanford Stadium plays the first few notes, after which the entire band joins in and a video montage, narrated by longtime Georgia radio broadcaster Larry Munson, is played that highlights the many great moments of Georgia football history. It is custom for fans to stand, remove their hats, and point towards the lone trumpeter as he plays the initial notes. This tradition is considered the climax of the Redcoat Band pregame show and was introduced before the 2000 season.
 "How 'bout them Dawgs" is a slogan of recent vintage that first surfaced in the late 1970s and has become a battle cry of Bulldog fans.  The slogan received national attention and exposure when Georgia won the national championship in 1980 and wire services proclaimed "how 'bout them dogs".
 Silver britches – When Wally Butts was named head coach in 1939, he changed the uniform by adding silver-colored pants to the bright-red jersey already in use. The "silver britches" became very popular, and were a source of multiple fan chants and sign references over the years, the most well-known being "Go You Silver Britches". When he was hired in 1964, Vince Dooley changed Georgia's uniform to use white pants, but reinstated the silver pants prior to Georgia's 1980 national championship season. Georgia's use of the "silver britches" continues to the present day.
 The "Dawg Walk" is a tradition that features the football players walking through a gathering of fans and the Redcoat Band near the Tate Student Center as they enter Sanford Stadium. Vince Dooley began the tradition, originally leading the team into the stadium from the East Campus Road side. Ray Goff changed the Dawg Walk to its current location in the 1990s, but eventually discontinued the practice altogether. Mark Richt revived it starting with the 2001 season, and it continues to the present day.

Uniforms
Georgia's standard home uniform has not significantly changed since 1980, and consists of a red helmet with the trademarked oval G, red jerseys, and famous silver britches.

Wally Butts first introduced the "silver britches", as they are colloquially known, in 1939. When Vince Dooley became Georgia's head coach, he changed the team's home uniform to include white pants. The uniform was changed back to silver pants prior to the 1980 season, and has remained silver ever since.

Georgia's earliest helmet was grey leather, to which a red block "G" logo was added in 1961. The shirts were usually red, sometimes with various striping patterns. Their uniforms in the pre-World War II era varied at times, sometimes significantly. Photographic evidence suggests that black shirts, vests, and stripes of various patterns were worn at times over the years.

Vince Dooley was the first to incorporate a red helmet into the uniform in 1964, adopting the oval "G", a white stripe, and white facemasks. Anne Donaldson, who graduated from Georgia with a BFA degree and was married to Georgia assistant coach John Donaldson, was asked by Dooley to come up with a new helmet design to replace the previous silver helmet. Dooley liked the forward oriented stylized "G" Donaldson produced, and it was adopted by him. Since the Georgia "G" was similar to the Green Bay Packers' "G" used since 1961, Coach Dooley cleared its use with the Packers organization. Nonetheless, Georgia has a registered trademark for its "G" and the Packers' current, redesigned, "G" logo is modeled after the University of Georgia's redesign of Green Bay's original "G" logo. The helmet change was part of a drastic uniform redesign by Dooley, who also replaced the traditional silver pants with white pants that included a black-red-black stripe. The jerseys remained similar to the pre-1964 design, however, with a red jersey and white numbers.

Prior to the 1980 season, the "silver britches" were re-added to Georgia's uniform with a red-white-black stripe down the side. Since the 1980 season, Georgia has utilized the same basic uniform concept. The sleeve stripes, trim colors, and font on Georgia's home and away jerseys have varied many times, but the home jerseys have remained generally red with white numbers, and away jerseys have remained generally white with black numbers.

The most recent trim redesign occurred in 2005, when sleeve stripe patterns were dropped in favor of solid black jersey cuffs on the home jersey and solid red cuffs on the away jersey. Matte gray pants have also been used at times instead of "true" silver since 2004, mainly because the matte gray pants are of a lighter material.

One of the things that make Georgia's uniform unique is its relative longevity, and the fact that it has very rarely changed over the years. There have been occasions, however, when alternate uniforms have been worn.
 Red pants were used instead of silver as part of Georgia's away uniform at various times during the 1980s and were worn as a "throwback" alternate uniform in 2020.
 Black facemasks and a white-black-white helmet stripe were worn during the 1991 Independence Bowl.
 Black pants were used instead of silver as part of Georgia's away uniform (Georgia chose to wear white as the designated home team) during the 1998 Outback Bowl and home uniform during the 1998 Florida game.
 Black jerseys were worn instead of red as part of Georgia's home uniform in games against Auburn and Hawaii during the 2007 season, in 2008 against Alabama, 2016 against Louisiana-Lafayette and 2020 vs. Mississippi State. Georgia also wore black jerseys as the visiting team in the 2021 Peach Bowl vs. Cincinnati, which wore red jerseys. 
 A unique away uniform was worn against Florida in 2009. This uniform included black helmets with red facemasks, a white stripe, and the traditional oval "G" logo; white jerseys with black numbers; and black pants.
 For the 2011 Chick-fil-A Kickoff Game against Boise State in the Georgia Dome, Georgia wore a Nike Pro Combat uniform that was significantly different from the traditional home uniforms. The Nike Pro Combat uniforms used a non-traditional matte-finish red color, and included the following:
 Silver helmets with a large red stripe and traditional oval "G" logo
 Black facemasks with a large red stripe in the middle, mirroring the red stripe on the helmet
 Two-tone red jerseys with black sleeves, trim, and numbers
 The word "Georgia" on the back of the jerseys instead of players' names
 Red pants

Rivalries

The Bulldogs have three main football rivals: Auburn, Florida, and Georgia Tech. All three rivalries were first contested over 100 years ago, though the series records are disputed in two cases. Georgia does not include two games from 1943 and 1944 against Georgia Tech (both UGA losses) in its reckoning of the series record, because Georgia's players were in World War II and Georgia Tech's players were not. Georgia also includes a game against one of the four predecessor institutions of the modern University of Florida in 1904 (a Georgia win) that national sportswriters and Florida's athletic association do not include.

Georgia has long-standing football rivalries with other universities as well, with over 50 games against five additional teams. Since the formation of the SEC Eastern Division in 1992, Georgia has had  emerging rivalries with the Tennessee Volunteers and South Carolina Gamecocks.  From 1944 to 1965, the Bulldogs played each season against the Alabama Crimson Tide. While the two bordering schools no longer play annually, they have faced off against each other in three SEC Championship Games and two College Football Playoff National Championships since 2010, bringing the once dormant rivalry back to prominence.

Auburn 

Georgia's oldest and longest-running rivalry is the series with Auburn, which dates to 1892. As it is the oldest rivalry still contested between teams in the South, the series is referred to by both schools as the "Deep South's Oldest Rivalry". Although historically close, Georgia has won 15 out of the last 18 matchups and leads the series 63–56–8 through the 2022 season.

Clemson 

Although no longer contested annually, the series with Clemson dates to 1897. The two schools are separated by a mere 70 miles and played annually from 1962 to 1987. The rivalry took on national importance in the early 1980s, when both Georgia and Clemson won national titles and were consistently highly ranked. The rivalry is renewed on an intermittent basis, with the next matchup scheduled in 2024. Georgia leads the series 43–18–4 through the 2021 season.

Florida 

Played annually (except for two occasions) at the neutral-site of Jacksonville, Florida since 1933, the Georgia-Florida rivalry is known nationwide for its associated tailgating and pageantry, being referred to as "The World's Largest Outdoor Cocktail Party", although that name is no longer used officially.  The Georgia-Florida rivalry annually carries importance in the SEC race as the two schools have combined for 23 appearances in the SEC Championship game. The series record is disputed, with Georgia claiming a lead of 55–44–2 through the 2022 season.

Georgia Tech 

Dating to 1893, the series with the in-state Georgia Tech Yellow Jackets has traditionally been played as the final regular season game of the season and was historically Georgia's most important and fierce rivalry. Since 2000 Georgia has dominated the series, winning 18 out of 21 matchups, lessening the importance of the once-close series. Georgia leads the series 70–41–5 through the 2022 season.

South Carolina 

The series with South Carolina dates to 1894. The border-rivalry gained importance when South Carolina joined the SEC in 1992, and gained intensity when former Florida coach, Steve Spurrier, coached the Gamecocks from 2006 to 2015. Georgia leads the series 54–19–2 through the 2022 season.

Tennessee 

The series with Tennessee dates to 1899. The annual rivalry began in 1992 upon the creation of the SEC Eastern Division and annually plays an important role in deciding the division champion. Georgia and Tennessee are the third and second most winningest SEC programs behind only Alabama. Georgia leads the series 27–23–2 through the 2022 season.

Vanderbilt 

The series with Vanderbilt dates to 1893. Georgia leads the series 59–20–2 through the 2021 season.

Alabama 

The series with Alabama dates to 1895. Alabama leads the series 42–26–4 through the 2021 season.

Players

National award winners

 Heisman Trophy
Frank Sinkwich – 1942
Herschel Walker – 1982
 Maxwell Award
Charley Trippi – 1946
Herschel Walker – 1982
 Walter Camp Award
Herschel Walker – 1982
 Bronko Nagurski Trophy
Champ Bailey – 1998
 Butkus Award
Roquan Smith – 2017
Nakobe Dean – 2021
 Chuck Bednarik Award
David Pollack – 2004
Jordan Davis – 2021
 Doak Walker Award
Garrison Hearst – 1992
 Draddy Trophy
Matt Stinchcomb – 1998
 ESPY Award
Garrison Hearst – 1992
 Jim Thorpe Award
Deandre Baker – 2018
 Lombardi Award
David Pollack – 2004
 Lott Trophy
David Pollack – 2004
 Lou Groza Award
Rodrigo Blankenship – 2019

 Outland Trophy
Bill Stanfill – 1968
Jordan Davis – 2021
 Ted Hendricks Award
David Pollack – 2003, 2004
 Ray Guy Award
Drew Butler – 2009
 Paul Hornung Award
Brandon Boykin – 2011
 John Mackey Award
Brock Bowers – 2022
 Burlsworth Trophy
Stetson Bennett – 2022
 Manning Award
Stetson Bennett – 2022

All-Americans
The Bulldogs have had 84 players selected to the All-America team through the 2019 season. Through the 2021 season, there have been 39 consensus selections of which 15 were unanimous.

While several players were selected in more than one year, only Frank Sinkwich, Herschel Walker, David Pollack, and Jarvis Jones were selected as consensus All-Americans more than once.

 Bob McWhorter, HB 1913
 David Paddock, QB 1914
 Joe Bennett, T 1922, 1923
 Chick Shiver, E 1927
 Tom Nash, E 1927†
 Herb Maffett, E 1930
 Red Maddox, G 1930
 Vernon Smith, E 1931†
 John Bond, HB 1935
 Bill Hartman, FB 1937
 Frank Sinkwich, HB 1941†, 1942‡
 George Poschner, E 1942
 Mike Castronis, T 1945
 Charley Trippi, TB 1946‡
 Herb St. John, G 1946
 Dan Edwards, E 1947
 John Rauch, QB 1948
 Harry Babcock, E 1952
 Zeke Bratkowski, QB 1952, 1953
 Johnny Carson, E 1953
 Pat Dye, G 1959, 1960
 Fran Tarkenton, QB 1960
 Jim Wilson, T 1964
 Ray Rissmiller, T 1964
 George Patton, DT 1965
 Edgar Chandler, OG 1966, 1967†
 Lynn Hughes, S 1966
 Jake Scott, S 1968†
 Bill Stanfill, DT 1968†
 Steve Greer, DG 1969
 Tom Lyons, C 1969, 1970
 Royce Smith, OG 1971‡
 Craig Hertwig, OT 1974
 Randy Johnson, OG 1975†
 Mike "Moonpie" Wilson, OT 1976
 Joel Parrish, OG 1976†
 Ben Zambiasi, LB 1976
 Allan Leavitt, K 1976
 George Collins, OG 1977
 Bill Krug, ROV 1977
 Rex Robinson, K 1979, 1980
 Scott Woerner, CB 1980
 Herschel Walker, TB 1980‡, 1981‡, 1982‡
 Terry Hoage, ROV 1982†, 1983†
 Jimmy Payne, DT 1982
 Freddie Gilbert, DE 1983
 Kevin Butler, PK 1983, 1984†
 Jeff Sanchez, S 1984†
 Peter Anderson, C 1985†
 John Little, S 1986
 Wilbur Strozier, OT 1986
 Tim Worley, TB 1988†
 Troy Sadowski, TE 1988
 Garrison Hearst, TB 1992‡
 Bernard Williams OT 1993
 Eric Zeier, QB 1994
 Matt Stinchcomb, OT 1997, 1998†
 Champ Bailey, CB 1998†
 Richard Seymour, DT 2000
 Boss Bailey, LB 2002
 David Pollack, DE 2002†, 2003, 2004†
 Jon Stinchcomb, OT 2002
 Sean Jones, ROV 2003
 Thomas Davis, FS 2004†
 Greg Blue, FS 2005†
 Max Jean-Gilles, OG 2005†
 Knowshon Moreno, TB 2008
 Drew Butler, P 2009‡
 Justin Houston, LB 2010
 Bacarri Rambo, FS 2011
 Orson Charles, TE 2011
 Ben Jones, C 2011
 Jarvis Jones, LB 2011†, 2012‡
 Roquan Smith, LB 2017‡
 Lamont Gaillard, C 2018
 Deandre Baker, CB 2018†
 Andrew Thomas, OT 2018, 2019‡
 Rodrigo Blankenship, K 2019
 J. R. Reed, S 2019†
 Eric Stokes, CB 2020
 Brock Bowers, TE 2021, 2022
 Lewis Cine, SS 2021
 Jordan Davis, DL 2021‡
 Nakobe Dean, LB 2021‡
 Jalen Carter, DL 2022‡
 Christopher Smith II, DB 2022‡

† Consensus All-American
‡ Consensus All-American that was selected by a unanimous vote

Retired numbers

Hall of Fame inductees

Pro Football Hall of Fame

Five former Georgia players have been inducted into the Pro Football Hall of Fame.

College Football Hall of Fame

Nineteen former Georgia players and coaches have been inducted in the College Football Hall of Fame. In addition, one former player, Pat Dye, has been inducted into the Hall as a coach for Auburn.

Players

Coaches

Future opponents

Non-division opponents 
Georgia plays Auburn as a permanent non-division opponent annually and rotates around the West division among the other six schools.

Non-conference opponents 
Announced schedules as of January 26, 2023.

 Neutral-site matchup with Clemson (2024) will be held in Atlanta.

See also
 Georgia Bulldogs
 Larry Munson – "The Voice of the Bulldogs", Georgia football play by play announcer from 1966 to 2008.

References

Further reading
 Stegeman, John F. (1997). The Ghosts of Herty Field: Early Days on a Southern Gridiron, Athens, Georgia: University of Georgia Press. 
 Reed, Thomas Walter (1949). Athens, Georgia: University of Georgia Press. History of the University of Georgia Chapter XVII: Athletics at the University from the Beginning Through 1947 imprint pages 3420–3691
 Dooley, Vincent J. (2014). "History Now: A Year Like No Other: Football on the University of Georgia Campus, 1942". Georgia Historical Quarterly, Autumn 2014, Vol. 98, Issue 3, pp. 192–216.

External links

 

 
American football teams established in 1892
1892 establishments in Georgia (U.S. state)